An armoured corps (also mechanized corps or tank corps) is a specialized military organization whose role is to conduct armoured forces. The units belonging to an armoured corps include military staff, and are equipped with tanks and other armoured fighting vehicles, as well as supporting vehicles. 

The term may refer to two different types of organizations:

 A state's top-level branch of the ground forces which serves as the umbrella for all of its specialized armoured formations
 Any of the corps-sized formations within a ground forces that are composed chiefly of military units serving in the armoured role

List of armoured forces

The armoured, tank, or mechanized corps of various nations' armed forces during different time periods include:

 Royal Australian Armoured Corps
 Royal Canadian Armoured Corps
 Bangladesh Armoured Corps   
 British Indian Armoured Corps (to 1947)
 Indian Army Armoured Corps (from 1947)
 Israeli Armored Corps
 Egyptian Armored Corps
 Royal New Zealand Armoured Corps
 Pakistan Armoured Corps
 Panzerwaffe, Nazi Germany
 Sri Lanka Armoured Corps
 Swedish Armoured Troops
 Royal Armoured Corps, United Kingdom
 Ukrainian Armoured Forces

Corps-sized armoured formations 

Armoured, tank, or mechanized corps-sized formations (typically composed of divisions and belonging to a field army), include:

 Malaysian Royal Armoured Corps
 Rhodesian Armoured Corps
Mechanised corps (Soviet Union)
1st Mechanized Corps (Soviet Union)
2nd Mechanized Corps (Soviet Union)
3rd Mechanized Corps (Soviet Union)
4th Mechanized Corps (Soviet Union)
6th Mechanized Corps (Soviet Union)
8th Mechanized Corps (Soviet Union)
9th Mechanized Corps (Soviet Union)
10th Mechanized Corps (Soviet Union)
12th Mechanized Corps (Soviet Union)
21st Mechanized Corps (Soviet Union)
24th Mechanised Corps
3rd Mechanised Corps (Soviet Union)
5th Mechanised Corps (Soviet Union)
1st Guards Mechanized Corps (Soviet Union)
2nd Guards Mechanised Corps
6th Guards Mechanised Corps
6th Guards Mechanized Corps (Soviet Union)
9th Guards Mechanized Corps
5th Guards Mechanised Corps
Tank Corps (Soviet), a type of Red Army formation used up to World War II
 Tank Corps of the American Expeditionary Force, a United States unit in World War I
 Tank Corps, National Army, a stateside United States unit during World War I
 I Armored Corps (United States)
 Tank Corps, later Royal Tank Corps, early name of the Royal Tank Regiment (UK)

See also
 Russian Tank Troops
 Armoured warfare
 Panzer corps

 
Former disambiguation pages converted to set index articles